Arnold Joseph McGrath (June 2, 1912 – August 24, 1967) was a Canadian politician. He served in the Legislative Assembly of British Columbia from 1939 to 1941  from the electoral district of Cranbrook, a member of the Liberal party. He was the youngest member of the legislature during his term of service. McGrath died in Calgary in 1967.

References

1912 births
1967 deaths